John Michael Watson (born 1936) is an English botanist, who has worked with the flora of Argentina, Bolivia and Chile. He has visited the Ruiz Leal Herbarium in Mendoza, Argentina.

He married his colleague Ana Rosa Flores [es] in 1953, owning the botanic nursery business Flores & Watson Seeds. They have embarked on various trips to collect specimens from Argentina, Bolivia and Chile.

Notable publications 

 John Michael Watson, Ana Rosa Flores. 2009. A new and rare rosulate species of Viola (Violaceae) from Argentina. Phytotaxa 2: 19–23
 Watson, J.M. (2019). Lest we forget. A new identity and status for a Viola of section Andinium W. Becker; named for an old and treasured friend and companion. Plus another... (PDF). International Rock Gardener (117).

References 

Living people
1936 births
Place of birth missing (living people)
Date of birth missing (living people)
English botanists
20th-century British botanists